Cryptography was used extensively during World War II because of the importance of radio communication and the ease of radio interception. The nations involved fielded a plethora of code and cipher systems, many of the latter using rotor machines. As a result, the theoretical and practical aspects of cryptanalysis, or codebreaking, were much advanced.

Possibly the most important codebreaking event of the war was the successful decryption by the Allies of the German "Enigma" Cipher.  The first break into Enigma was accomplished by Polish Cipher Bureau around 1932; the techniques and insights used were passed to the French and British Allies just before the outbreak of the war in 1939. They were substantially improved by British efforts at Bletchley Park during the war. Decryption of the Enigma Cipher allowed the Allies to read important parts of German radio traffic on important networks and was an invaluable source of military intelligence throughout the war. Intelligence from this source and other high level sources, such as  Cryptanalysis of the Lorenz cipher, was eventually called Ultra.

A similar break into the most secure Japanese diplomatic cipher, designated Purple by the US Army Signals Intelligence Service, started before the US entered the war. Product from this source was called Magic.

On the other side, German code breaking in World War II achieved some notable successes cracking British naval and other ciphers.

Australia
 Central Bureau
 FRUMEL: Fleet Radio Unit, Melbourne
 Secret Intelligence Australia

Finland
 Finnish Defence Intelligence Agency

France
 PC Bruno
 Hans-Thilo Schmidt

Germany
 Enigma machine
 Fish (cryptography) British codename for German teleprinter ciphers
 Lorenz cipher a Fish cipher codenamed Tunny by the British
 Siemens and Halske T52 Geheimfernschreiber, a Fish cipher codenamed Sturgeon by the British
 Short Weather Cipher
 B-Dienst
 Reservehandverfahren
 OKW/CHI
 Gisbert Hasenjaeger

Italy
 Hagelin machine
 Enigma machine

Japan
 Japanese army and diplomatic codes 
 Japanese naval codes
 PURPLE
 JN-25

Poland
 Cryptanalysis of the Enigma
 Biuro Szyfrów (Cipher Bureau)
 Marian Rejewski
 Jerzy Różycki
 Henryk Zygalski
 bomba
  Lacida Machine

Sweden
 Arne Beurling

United Kingdom
 Bletchley Park
 Cryptanalysis of the Enigma
 Cryptanalysis of the Lorenz cipher
 Far East Combined Bureau (FECB) 
 Naval Intelligence Division (NID)
 Wireless Experimental Centre (WEC) 
 Bombe 
 Colossus computer
 Typex
 SYKO
 Ultra
 Alan Turing
 W. T. Tutte
 John Tiltman
 Max Newman
 Tommy Flowers
 I. J. Good
 John Herivel
 Leo Marks
 Gordon Welchman
 Poem code

United States
 Magic (cryptography)
 Signals Intelligence Service US Army, see also Arlington Hall
 OP-20-G US Navy Signals Intelligence group
 Elizebeth Smith Friedman
 William Friedman
 Frank Rowlett
 Abraham Sinkov
 Genevieve Grotjan Feinstein
 Leo Rosen
 Joseph Rochefort, leader of the effort to crack Japanese Naval codes
 Joseph Mauborgne
 Agnes Meyer Driscoll
 SIGABA cipher machine
 SIGSALY voice encryption
 SIGTOT one-time tape system
 M-209 cipher machine
 Station HYPO cryptanalysis group
 Station CAST cryptanalysis group
 Station NEGAT

See also
Cryptography
History of cryptography
World War I cryptography

 Ultra (cryptography)
 Magic (cryptography)

 Cryptanalysis of the Enigma
 Bombe

 Enigma (machine)
 SIGABA
 TypeX
 Lorenz cipher
 Geheimfernschreiber
 Codetalkers
 PURPLE
 SIGSALY
 JN-25

 Bletchley Park
 Biuro Szyfrów
 PC Bruno
 SIS US Army, later moved to Arlington Hall
 OP-20-G US Navy

 Marian Rejewski
 Jerzy Różycki
 Henryk Zygalski

 Alan Turing
 W. T. Tutte
 John Tiltman
 Max Newman
 Tommy Flowers
 I. J. Good

 William Friedman
 Frank Rowlett
 Abraham Sinkov
 Joseph Rochefort
 Agnes Meyer Driscoll

 Hans-Thilo Schmidt

References

History of cryptography
Cryptography